Henry Dunning Moore (April 13, 1817 – August 11, 1887) was a Whig member of the U.S. House of Representatives from Pennsylvania.

Early life
Henry D. Moore was born in Goshen, New York.  He moved with his parents to New York City in 1828.  He attended the public schools and engaged in the tailoring business.  He moved to Philadelphia in 1844 and engaged in the mahogany and marble business.

Political career
Moore was elected as a Whig to the Thirty-first and Thirty-second Congresses.  He was not a candidate for reelection in 1852.  He was an unsuccessful candidate for mayor of Philadelphia in 1856.  He was a delegate to the 1860 Republican National Convention.

He was elected State treasurer during Governor Curtin's administration and served from 1861 to 1863 and 1864 to 1865.  He was appointed collector of the port of Philadelphia on March 30, 1869, and served until March 26, 1871, when he resigned.

Russia
He traveled in Europe and resided in St. Petersburg, Russia, from 1870 to 1877.

Death
He became associated with and managed the silver mines known as "The Daisy" in Big Evens Gulch near Leadville, Colorado, from 1885 until his death there in 1887.  Originally interred in Monument Cemetery in Philadelphia, he was reinterred in 1956 at Lawnview Memorial Park in Rockledge, Pennsylvania.

References

1817 births
1887 deaths
Politicians from Philadelphia
Burials at Lawnview Memorial Park
Burials at Monument Cemetery
Whig Party members of the United States House of Representatives from Pennsylvania
People from Goshen, New York
19th-century American politicians